Ivanovtsi is a village in Kyustendil Municipality, Kyustendil Province, south-western Bulgaria.

References

Villages in Kyustendil Province